The Apertura 2014 season was the 33rd edition of El Salvador's Primera Division since its establishment of an Apertura and Clausura format. Isidro Metapán were the defending champions. The league consisted of 10 teams, each playing a home and away game against the other clubs for a total of 18 games, respectively. The top four teams at the end of the regular season took part in the playoffs.

Team information
A total of 10 teams will contest the league, including 9 sides from the Clausura 2014 and one promoted from the 2013–14 Segunda División.

Firpo were relegated to 2014–15 Segunda División the previous season.

The relegated team were replaced by 2013–14 Segunda División Playoffs promotion winner. Pasaquina won the Apertura 2013 title, this led to take part of the promotion playoffs along with the Clausura 2014 champions side Once Lobos. Pasaquina won the playoffs by the score of 2-1.

Promotion and relegation
Promoted from Segunda División de Fútbol Salvadoreño as of June 6, 2014.
Champions: Pasaquina
Relegated to Segunda División de Fútbol Salvadoreño as of June 6, 2014.
Last Place: C.D. Luis Ángel Firpo

Stadia and locations

Personnel and sponsoring

Managerial changes

Before the start of the season

During the season

League table

Results

Top goalscorers

Playoffs

Semi-finals

First leg

Second leg

Águila won 1–0 on aggregate.

Isidro Metapán won 2 – 1 on aggregate.

Final

List of foreign players in the league
This is a list of foreign players in Clausura 2014. The following players:
have played at least one apertura game for the respective club.
have not been capped for the El Salvador national football team on any level, independently from the birthplace

A new rule was introduced a few season ago, that clubs can only have three foreign players per club and can only add a new player if there is an injury or player/s is released.

C.D. Águila
  Eder Arias
  Sean Fraser
  Ronaille Calheria Seara

Alianza F.C.
  Yeison Murillo
  Jesus Toscanini
  Christian Yeladian

Atlético Marte
  Carlos Parra
  Nestor Ayala 
  Marcelo Rojas Ospina

C.D. Dragón
  Jhony Rios
  Jimmy Valoyes
  Christian Vaquero 
  Cleber Lucas dos Santos

Juventud Independiente
  Félix Garcia
  Carlos Palomino 
  Augustine Jibrin

 (player released during the season)

C.D. FAS
  Kevin Mohammed 
  Gonzalo Mazzia
  Márcio Teruel

A.D. Isidro Metapán
  Héctor Ramos
   David López
  Romeo Ovando Parkes

Pasaquina
  Carlos Alberto Giorno  
  Leandro Cabral
  Yohan Ambuila 
  Agustín Adorni

Santa Tecla F.C.
  Facundo Nicolás Simioli
  Ricardo Ferreira da Silva
  Ruben Dario Perez

UES
  Cristian Gil Mosquera
  Garrick Gordon
  Gabriel Ríos

External links

Primera División de Fútbol Profesional Apertura seasons
El
1